The San Pedro Macati Church, also known as Saints Peter and Paul Parish, is a Roman Catholic Church located in Makati Poblacion, the oldest part of Makati and for that reason, the cultural and heritage barangay of Makati, Philippines. 
In front of the church facade is Plaza Cristo Rey, which was formerly the San Pedro de Macati Cemetery. The Poblacion Church is a government-recognized cultural property based on the official list provided by the National Historical Commission of the Philippines. 
After 394 years, the Church was re-dedicated, the first dedication happened in 1620 when it became a parish church, the next after the reconstruction of the facade in 1796 and finally again, on the 30th day of January, 2015. The dedication was led by Luis Antonio Cardinal Tagle, D.D., Archbishop of Manila, con-celebrated by Gerardo O. Santos, Ed.D, the then-Parish Priest, bishops, and priests.

The Venerated Marian Image enshrined was granted a decree of Canonical Coronation by Pope Francis. The Coronation Rites was held on March 16, 2019

History 

Before the land seizure of the Spanish, the area of today's San Pedro de Macati was part of the Kingdom of Sapa or Namayan, ruled by the Rajah Kalamayin whose residence was in Namayan, now part of Sta. Ana, Manila. The Franciscan missionaries were the first to convert the indigenous Tagalog of Sapa to the Christian Faith by 1578, after they had turned the original barangay into a visita called Sta. Ana de Sapa in 1570.

In 1589, Capitan Pedro de Brito, then an aide to the Spanish Army Chief of Staff, purchased today's church premises as part of a large property with a public bid of 1400 pesos, and installed his encomienda called "Hacienda Pedro". On July 1, 1608, de Brito, now the newly elected Alferez General, and his wife Ana de Herrera donated part of their land to the Jesuits. Fr. Gregorio Lopez, S.J. accepted the deed of donation and an endowment of 14,000 pesos for a house of probation. This house and the church were to be built in the highest hill in the area called Buenavista and were to be placed under the patronage of Saint Peter, the donor's name patron.

Construction of the first church was finished in 1620 under the direction of Fr. Pedro delos Montes, S.J. As the Jesuit encomienda began to earn at least 30,000 pesos annually from the production of earthenware, their vision of building an imposing structure could begin to be realized. The church known as San Pedro y Pablo Viejo was made from hewn stone, pebbles, and gravel mixed with mortar. Its facade is dominated with a three tiered papal tiara with the cross keys of Saint Peter.
In 1718, an ivory image of the Blessed Virgin Mary depicted as Virgen de la Rosa (Virgin of the Rose) was brought from Mexico to the Philippines through the Manila-Acapulco Galleon Trade by Jesuit Fr. Juan Delgado. This image of the Virgin Mary was enshrined in this church and was frequently venerated due to a relic of the Virgin's hair supposedly encapsuled in the image's breast.

According to a narrative by Nick Joaquin, this concept was backed by Fr. Pedro Murillo's description in his Historia de la Provincia de Filipinas de la Compania de Jesus (1749): “Your most holy image of the Nuestra Señora de la Rosa has on her breast a most precious treasure, greater than those which Tharsis had in is opulence, or Ophir with his most valuable metals can offer. This is the strand of hair of her most holy head, whose authenticity I read with great admiration. In the vast extent of the Indies that I know of, there exists no similar reliquary.”Unfortunately, the reliquary got lost together with the ivory hands and head of the statue in the Revolution of 1899. There remains an oval cavity in the upper body, the missing pards have been restored using wood as a material instead of ivory. 

In Lourdes Policarpio's view, the Virgin’s title stems from "Our Lady as the Mystical Rose" or “Rosa Mystica.” In Lucca, Italy, the feast of "Our Lady of the Rose" is celebrated on January 30. It is believed that three roses were found in the arms of Our Lady on January. when a deaf mute shepherd see the appearance of the Lady. He has able to speak after the apparition of Our Lady of Roses.

In the church parish, there are two famous festivals or fiestas held on June 29, the feast of Apostles Peter and Paul, and June 30, the feast of "Nuestra Señora dela Rosa". The "Panatang Sayaw", as the Bailes de los Arcos (Dance of the Arches) are called, are an old tradition going back at least to the beginnings of the 19th century. It is a ritual of praise and thanksgiving to the saints Peter and Paul and the Virgen de la Rosa.

The church was destroyed during the British occupation of Manila in 1762. It was reconstructed much later in 1849 using stones from nearby Guadalupe in Makati and Meycauayan in Bulacan province. Other materials used include yakal and molave as wood materials, and kapre shells for windows and baticulin, guijo timbers and conchas or seashells for its windows.

After the Jesuits’ expulsion the ownership changed. The Makati hacienda was reclaimed by the government and was sold in public auction in 1795 to Don Pedro de Garuga, Marquis of Villa Medina. Through the next half-century, the property changed hands three times, until, in 1851, it was bought by Don Jose Bonifacio Roxas, the founding father of the Roxas-Ayala-Zobel clan, who built a family manor on the riverbank, what is today's Poblacion's river park, "Casa Hacienda Park".

During the Philippine–American War from 1899 to 1902, the church was used as a hospital to tend wounded American soldiers. American volunteers also camped on church grounds. This stay, however, resulted in the loss of the ivory head and hands of the Virgen de la Rosa.

Over the years, the Makati Church underwent several renovations and changes in the design but most of its features like the reredos and the church bells are still original.

On October 29, 2018, the Congregation for Divine Worship and Discipline of the Sacraments granted a Canonical coronation to the image of the Virgen de la Rosa. The rite of crowning took place on March 16, 2019 presided by the Papal Nuncio to the Philippines.

Architecture 

The church structure follows the Baroque style of architecture. Its architectural feature of a single rectangular nave consisting of an apse and sacristy is typical of churches during the Spanish Colonial Period. The altar with its original carved reredos with motifs of various flowers and fruits following the Baroque Rococo tradition can still be found in the church.

Cultural property and historical marker 
The Saints Peter and Paul Parish is a government-recognized important cultural property with the placement of a historical marker around 1937 by the Philippine Historical Research and Markers Committee, the precursor to the present National Historical Commission of the Philippines.

Parish Priests

Former Priests

Present Priest

Chapel Communities 
 Chapel of the Sacred Heart of Jesus (Power Plant Mall, Brgy. Poblacion, Makati)
 Holy Cross Chapel (Kakarong Street, Brgy. Olympia, Makati)
 Our Lady of Lourdes Chapel (Honradez Street, Brgy. Olympia, Makati)
 San Fabian Chapel (Olympia Village, Makati)
 San Padre Pio Da Pietrelcina Chapel (Century City Mall, Brgy. Poblacion, Makati)

References

External links

Roman Catholic churches in Metro Manila
Cultural Properties of the Philippines in Metro Manila
Buildings and structures in Makati
Churches in the Roman Catholic Archdiocese of Manila